Woolcott is an unincorporated community located in Bracken County, Kentucky, United States. It was also known as Murrays Station.

References

Unincorporated communities in Bracken County, Kentucky
Unincorporated communities in Kentucky